Caídos en el infierno is a 1954 Argentine film directed and written by Luis César Amadori. It is based on Michael Valbeck's novel of the same name. The film was released on August 20, 1954.

Plot
Out of ambition, a woman sacrifices her true love and marries a man of fortune.

Cast
Laura Hidalgo as Wanda
Eduardo Cuitiño as Guillermo Brandsen
Alberto de Mendoza as Adrián Villar
Guillermo Battaglia as Mauro Cogan
Domingo Sapelli as Inspector Nielsen
Irma Roy as Hilda Villar
Susana Campos as Renata Brissol
Mario Lozano as Stefano
Pedro Laxalt as Dr. Mateo
Margarita Burke as Mucama

References

External links

Argentine black-and-white films
Films directed by Luis César Amadori
Argentine drama films
1954 drama films
1950s Argentine films